Joshua H. Bean (c. 1818 – November 7, 1852) was an American political figure.

Joshua Bean was born c. 1818 in Mason County, Kentucky to Phantly Roy Bean (November 21, 1804 – June 13, 1844) and his wife Anna Gore. His paternal grandparents were Benjamin Bean and his wife Fernetta Johnston, daughter of Archibald Johnston. Both grandparents were born in Virginia. Bean's brother would later be known as Judge Roy Bean.

Joshua Bean served with Zachary Taylor in the Mexican–American War and came to California in 1849 and San Diego in 1850, where he was a trader and saloon owner. Bean was appointed Major General of the State Militia and served to crush the Antonio Garra revolt in 1851. Later he had a small role in preventing the massacre of John Edward Irvine near Redlands, California.

San Diego was incorporated by the California State Legislature in 1850. Bean, the last alcalde of San Diego, was elected mayor in the first election under the charter on June 16. Bean was the first U.S. mayor of San Diego and served from 1850 until 1851. While mayor, he illegally "sold" City Hall and city pueblo lands to himself and his drinking buddy Lieutenant Cave J. Couts (the City Hall was recovered).

In 1851 he moved to Los Angeles, where he kept a saloon, and store, in Mission San Gabriel, called the Headquarters. He was ambushed and killed, just outside Mission San Gabriel, in 1852 during an argument over a woman.

References

Mayors of San Diego
1818 births
1852 deaths
People from Mason County, Kentucky
19th-century American politicians